Kazadayevka is a rural locality (a village) in Kazadayevsky Selsoviet, Sterlitamaksky District, Bashkortostan, Russia. The population was 51 as of 2010. There are four streets.

Geography 
Mariinsky is the nearest rural locality.

References 

Rural localities in Sterlitamaksky District